John Weldon (born May 11, 1945) is a Canadian actor, composer, animator and movie director, known for his National Film Board of Canada (NFB) animated shorts.

Born in Belleville, Ontario, Weldon lives in Montreal, Quebec. Following his retirement from the NFB, Weldon has devoted his time to songwriting and comic books, including a planned comic book series, Ashcan Alley.

Filmography
 What Do You Do? (1976, animator)
 Spinnolio  (1977)
 No Apple For Johnny  (1977;  written, animated  and directed)
 Special Delivery (1978; cowritten and directed with Eunice Macaulay)
 The Log Driver's Waltz (1979)
 Emergency Numbers (1984)
 Real Inside (1984)
 Of Dice and Men (1988)
 To Be (1990)
 The Lump (1991)
 Scant Sanity (1996)
 Frank the Wrabbit (1998)
 The Hungry Squid (2001)
 Yo (2003)
 Noël Noël (2003) (script)
 Home Security (2004)

Awards
 Academy Award for Best Animated Short Film for Special Delivery in 1979.
 Nominated for a Golden Palm for Best Short Film for To Be, in 1990.

See also 
Cordell Barker-similar in content
Richard Condie-similar in content
Cinema of Canada

References

External links
 John Weldon's Web Site
 Watch John Weldon's films at NFB.ca
 John Weldon at The Film Reference Library. Retrieved on July 8, 2007.
 

1945 births
Living people
Anglophone Quebec people
Artists from Montreal
Artists from Ontario
Canadian animated film directors
Directors of Best Animated Short Academy Award winners
Directors of Genie and Canadian Screen Award winners for Best Animated Short
Film directors from Montreal
Film directors from Ontario
National Film Board of Canada people
People from Belleville, Ontario
Producers who won the Best Animated Short Academy Award